Uxue Amaya Guereca Parra (born ) is a Mexican female volleyball player. She is a member of the Mexico women's national volleyball team and played for Jalisco in 2018. 

She was part of the Mexico national team at the 2017 FIVB Volleyball U20 Women's World Championship, and 2018 FIVB Volleyball Women's World Championship.

Clubs
  Jalisco (2014)

References

External links

2001 births
Living people
Mexican women's volleyball players
Place of birth missing (living people)